Verrucaria bernaicensis is a species of saxicolous (rock-dwelling), crustose lichen in the family Verrucariaceae. It was first formally described by Alexandre François Malbranche in 1869. It has a dull, pale grey thallus that is areolate to somewhat squamulose in form. Its perithecia are immersed in the substrata, measure 0.2–0.3 mm in diameter, and lack an involucrellum. Its ascospores are broadly ellipsoid to roughly spherical, measuring 9–11 by 7–9 μm. The lichen has been recorded from Asia, a few European countries, Russia and the Caucasus, and southwestern North America.

See also
List of Verrucaria species

References

bernaicensis
Lichen species
Lichens described in 1869
Lichens of Asia
Lichens of Europe
Lichens of North America